Proposition 209 (also known as the California Civil Rights Initiative or CCRI) is a California ballot proposition which, upon approval in November 1996, amended the state constitution to prohibit state governmental institutions from considering race, sex, or ethnicity, specifically in the areas of public employment, public contracting, and public education. Modeled on the Civil Rights Act of 1964, the California Civil Rights Initiative was authored by two California academics, Glynn Custred and Tom Wood. It was the first electoral test of affirmative action policies in North America. It passed with 55% in favor to 45% opposed.

History

Context 
The controversy pertaining to affirmative action in California can most notably be traced back to the historic 1978 Supreme Court case Regents of the University of California v. Bakke. There were two major decisions from the case that still stand today. Firstly, the quota system that was once used by the University of California, Davis’ admission process for minority students was ruled unlawful. Secondly, higher-level academic institutions were not prohibited from considering race in the admissions process. The ruling determined in Bakke acted as “a catalyst for voluntary affirmative action programs.”  Researchers suggest that the development of such programs for the sake of increasing campus diversity explains the controversy surrounding the implementation of Proposition 209 and Bakke marks the origination of affirmative action debates. Consequently, judiciaries and politicians have since devoted efforts to reinterpreting affirmative action, its related practices, and consequences for students.

Origins 
The political campaign to place the language of CCRI on the California ballot as a constitutional amendment was initiated by Joe Gelman (president of the Board of Civil Service Commissioners of the City of Los Angeles), Arnold Steinberg (a pollster and political strategist) and Larry Arnn (president of the Claremont Institute). It was later endorsed by Governor Pete Wilson and supported and funded by the California Civil Rights Initiative Campaign, led by University of California Regent Ward Connerly, a Wilson ally. A key co-chair of the campaign was law professor Gail Heriot, who served as a member of the United States Commission on Civil Rights. The initiative was opposed by affirmative action advocates and traditional civil rights and feminist organizations on the left side of the political spectrum. Proposition 209 was voted into law on November 5, 1996, with 55 percent of the vote, and has withstood legal scrutiny ever since.

Senate Bill 185 
On September 1, 2011, SB 185 passed both chambers of the California State Legislature, but was vetoed by Governor Jerry Brown. SB 185 would have countered Proposition 209 and authorized the University of California and the California State University to consider race, gender, ethnicity, and national origin, along with other relevant factors, in undergraduate and graduate admissions, to the maximum extent permitted by the 14th Amendment to the United States Constitution, Section 31 of Article I of the California Constitution, and relevant case law. SB 185 was strongly supported by the University of California Students Association.

Senate Constitutional Amendment No. 5 
On December 3, 2012, California State Senator Edward Hernandez introduced California Senate Constitutional Amendment No.5 (SCA-5) in the State Senate. This initiative proposed an amendment to the state constitution to remove provisions of California Proposition 209 related to public post-secondary education, to permit state universities to consider applicants' race, gender, color, ethnicity, or national origin in admission decisions. If passed by both the State Senate and State Assembly, SCA-5 would have been presented to California voters in the November 2014 election. SCA-5 was passed by the California State Senate on January 30, 2014. On February 24, 2014, Gene D. Block, chancellor of UCLA, sent an open letter to all students and faculty expressing his strong opposition to Proposition 209. Following resistance from various citizen groups, including Asian American groups, Senator Hernandez withdrew his measure from consideration.

Proposition 16 
The legislation that later became Proposition 16 was first introduced as California Assembly Constitutional Amendment No. 5 (ACA 5). It was introduced by Assemblymembers Shirley Weber, Mike Gipson, and Miguel Santiago on January 18, 2019. ACA 5 is a proposed constitutional amendment that repeals the provisions enacted by Proposition 209. In June 2020, the California State Legislature passed ACA 5 with more than a two-thirds vote in each house, allowing the proposal to become a qualified ballot measure and later Proposition 16. Proposition 16 was rejected by voters in the November 2020 election, meaning that Prop 209 remains in the California Constitution.

National impact 
In November 2006, a similar amendment modeled on California's Proposition 209 was passed in Michigan, titled the Michigan Civil Rights Initiative. The constitutionality of the Michigan Civil Rights Initiative was challenged in the 6th Circuit Court of Appeals. The case, Schuette v. Coalition to Defend Affirmative Action, made its way to the United States Supreme Court. On April 22, 2014, the US Supreme Court ruled 6-2 that the Michigan Civil Rights Initiative is constitutional, and that states had the right to ban the practice of racial and gender preferences/affirmative action if they chose to do so through the electoral process.

Text
The text of Proposition 209 was drafted by Cal State anthropology professor Glynn Custred and California Association of Scholars Executive Director Thomas Wood.  Its passage amended the California constitution to include a new section (Section 31 of Article I), which now reads:

(a) The state shall not discriminate against, or grant preferential treatment to, any individual or group on the basis of race, sex, color, ethnicity, or national origin in the operation of public employment, public education, or public contracting.

(b) This section shall apply only to action taken after the section's effective date.

(c) Nothing in this section shall be interpreted as prohibiting bona fide qualifications based on sex which are reasonably necessary to the normal operation of public employment, public education, or public contracting.

(d) Nothing in this section shall be interpreted as invalidating any court order or consent decree which is in force as of the effective date of this section.

(e) Nothing in this section shall be interpreted as prohibiting action which must be taken to establish or maintain eligibility for any federal program, where ineligibility would result in a loss of federal funds to the state.

(f) For the purposes of this section, "state" shall include, but not necessarily be limited to, the state itself, any city, county, city and county, public university system, including the University of California, community college district, school district, special district, or any other political subdivision or governmental instrumentality of or within the state.

(g) The remedies available for violations of this section shall be the same, regardless of the injured party's race, sex, color, ethnicity, or national origin, as are otherwise available for violations of then-existing California antidiscrimination law.

(h) This section shall be self-executing. If any part or parts of this section are found to be in conflict with federal law or the United States Constitution, the section shall be implemented to the maximum extent that federal law and the United States Constitution permit. Any provision held invalid shall be severable from the remaining portions of this section.

Support
Supporters of Proposition 209 contended that existing affirmative action programs led public employers and universities to reject applicants based on their race, and that Proposition 209 would "restore and reconfirm the historic intention of the 1964 Civil Rights Act." The basic and simple premise of Proposition 209 is that every individual has a right, and that right is not to be discriminated against, or granted a preference, based on their race or gender.  Since the number of available positions are limited, discriminating against or giving unearned preference to a person based solely, or even partially on race or gender deprives qualified applicants of all races an equal opportunity to succeed. It also pits one group against another and perpetuates social tension.

Individuals in support
 Ward Connerly
 Bob Dole, 1996 presidential candidate
 Dan Lungren, California Attorney General
 Pete Wilson, Governor of California

Organizations in support
 American Civil Rights Institute
 California Republican Party
 Center for Equal Opportunity
 Pacific Legal Foundation

Opposition

Opponents of Proposition 209 argued that it would end affirmative action practices of tutoring, mentoring, outreach and recruitment of women and minorities in California universities and businesses and would gut state and local protections against discrimination. A large, multiethnic coalition of civil rights groups, politicians, and celebrities stood in opposition to Proposition 209. Immediately after passage of Proposition 209, students held demonstrations and walk-outs in protest at several universities including UC Berkeley, UCLA, UC Santa Cruz, and San Francisco State University.

Individuals in opposition 
 Barbara Boxer, U.S. Senator
 Ellen DeGeneres, talk show host
 Dianne Feinstein, U.S. Senator
 Dolores Huerta, civil rights activist
 Rev. Jesse Jackson, civil rights activist
 Coretta Scott King, wife of the late Dr. Martin Luther King Jr. 
 William Levada, Archbishop of San Francisco
 Roger Mahony, cardinal and Archbishop of Los Angeles
 Rosa Parks, civil rights leader, 
 Colin Powell, then-retired U.S. general
 Bruce Springsteen, musician
 Chang-Lin Tien, UC Berkeley Chancellor
 Charles E. Young, UCLA Chancellor

Organizations in opposition

Results

Voter demographics
On November 5, 1996, the Los Angeles Times conducted an exit poll of 2,473 voters who cast ballots in the general election at 40 polling places. The margin of error was 3 percent (but higher for some subgroups). The following is the exit poll data on Proposition 209:

Aftermath

Legal challenges
On November 27, 1996, U.S. District Court Judge Thelton Henderson blocked enforcement of the proposition. A three-judge panel of the 9th Circuit Court of Appeals subsequently overturned that ruling. Proposition 209 has been the subject of many lawsuits in state courts since its passage but has withstood legal scrutiny over the years.

On August 2, 2010, the Supreme Court of California found for the second time that Proposition 209 was constitutional. The ruling, by a 6-1 majority, followed a unanimous affirmation in 2000 of the constitutionality of Prop. 209 by the same court.

On April 2, 2012, the 9th U.S. Circuit Court of Appeals rejected the latest challenge to Proposition 209.  The three-judge panel concluded that it was bound by a 9th Circuit ruling in 1997 upholding the constitutionality of the affirmative action ban.  Ninth Circuit Judge A. Wallace Tashima disagreed in part with the ruling, saying he believes the court "wrongly decided" the issue in 1997.

Effect on enrollment, graduation, and income
According to UC Office of the President, "Proposition 209 instigated a dramatic change in UC admissions policy, with URG [under represented group] enrollment at the Berkeley and UCLA campuses immediately falling by more than 60 percent and systemwide URG enrollment falling by at least 12 percent." The same report concluded that "Prop 209 led URG applicants to cascade out of UC into measurably less-advantageous universities, which combined with declines in degree attainment and STEM persistence to lower each URG applicant’s wages by about 5 percent between ages 23 and 35."

Based on "University of California Applicants, Admits and New Enrollees by Campus, Race/Ethnicity", prepared by Institutional Research, the University of California Office of the President, August 11, 2011, enrollment percentages of the four major ethnic groups university-wide are:

African American enrollment rates dropped significantly immediately after the passage of Prop 209. Criticism was raised that of the 4,422 students in UCLA's freshman class of 2006, only 96 (2.26%) were African American.

The percentage of Latino students admitted to the UC system as of 2007 exceeded the Proposition 209 level; however, this is a reflection of the increase in the Latino population in the state of California and the increased capacity within the UC system.

Researchers also found that enrollment statistics for Native American students beginning in 1997 through 2006 declined by 38% cumulatively and, unlike other ethnic groups, has not increased since.

A comprehensive but non-peer reviewed study by Zachary Bleemer found that Prop 209 has had a negative impact on graduation rates, graduate school attendance, and income for black and hispanic students.

Private sector response
One response to Proposition 209 was the establishment of the IDEAL Scholars Fund to provide community and financial support for underrepresented students at the University of California, Berkeley. Private universities and colleges, as well as employers, are not subject to Proposition 209 unless they receive public contracts.

Public opinion regarding affirmative action
Public opinion polls on affirmative action have varied significantly. It is likely that survey design and the framing of the survey question itself may have significant effects on the survey results.

In a survey conducted by Gallup in 2013, 67% of U.S. adults believed college admission should be solely based on merit. According to Gallup: "One of the clearest examples of affirmative action in practice is colleges' taking into account a person's racial or ethnic background when deciding which applicants will be admitted. Americans seem reluctant to endorse such a practice, and even blacks, who have historically been helped by such programs, are divided on the matter. Aside from blacks, a majority of all other major subgroups believe colleges should determine admissions solely on merit."

In a national survey conducted by the Pew Research Center in 2014, among 3,335 Americans, 63% felt that affirmative action programs designed to increase the number of black and minority students on college campuses are a good thing.

In October 2018, APIA Vote and AAPI Data published the results of their 2018 Asian American Voter Survey and found that 66% of Asian Americans favor "affirmative action programs designed to help blacks, women, and other minorities get better access to education." Previous reports by these organizations have found consistent support for affirmative action by Asian Americans over time, in multiple surveys.

In February 2019, Gallup published the results of a November and December 2018 survey and found that support for affirmative action programs was growing. They polled 6,502 Americans. Of survey respondents, 65% favored affirmative action programs for women and 61% favored affirmative action programs for minorities.

Also in February 2019, the Pew Research Center published the results of a January and February 2019 survey and found that 73% of its respondents said that race or ethnicity should not be a factor in college admissions decisions. According to this survey's results, majorities across racial and ethnic groups agree that race should not be a factor in college admissions decisions. White adults are particularly likely to hold this view: 78% say this, compared with 65% of Hispanics, 62% of blacks, and 58% of Asians.

See also
 2020 California Proposition 16
 Regents of the University of California v. Bakke (1978)
 Grutter v. Bollinger (2003)
 Gratz v. Bollinger (2003)

References

Scholarship and commentary
Heriot, Gail (2001). University of California Admissions under Proposition 209: Unheralded Gains Face an Uncertain Future, NEXUS: A Journal of Opinion 6:163.
Jamison, Cynthia C. (2004). The Cost of Defiance: Plaintiffs’ Entitlement to Damages Under the California Civil Rights Initiative, Southwestern Univ. Law Review 33:521.
McCutcheon, Stephen R., Jr., & Travis J. Lindsey (2004). The Last Refuge of Official Discrimination: The Federal Funding Exception to California's Proposition 209, 44 Santa Clara Law Review 457.
Myers, Caitlin Knowles (2007). A Cure for Discrimination? Affirmative Action and the Case of California's Proposition 209, Industrial & Labor Relations Review 60:379.

External links
California Secretary of State Archive of the Proposition 209 Official Ballot Pamphlet
Berkeley's 209 Protest Home Page

209
1996
History of affirmative action in the United States
Initiatives in the United States
Opposition to affirmative action